Edgar Nemir (July 23, 1910 – February 1, 1969) was an American wrestler who competed in the 1932 Summer Olympics. In 1932, he won the silver medal in the Freestyle Featherweight competition. Nemir was born in Waco, Texas and died in Reno, Nevada.

External links
Olympic Profile

External links
 

1910 births
1969 deaths
Wrestlers at the 1932 Summer Olympics
American male sport wrestlers
Olympic silver medalists for the United States in wrestling
People from Waco, Texas
Medalists at the 1932 Summer Olympics